The Judge Louis R. Gates House is located at 4146 Cambridge Street in Kansas City, Kansas. Clarence E. Shepard was the architect of this example of a Prairie School residence. It was placed on the Register of Historic Kansas Places on July 3, 1979, and on the National Register of Historic Places on December 1, 1980. It was designated a Kansas City Historic Landmark on August 26, 1982.

It is a two-story Prairie School house with a hipped roof, wide eaves, and a side entrance porch.

References

Houses on the National Register of Historic Places in Kansas
Prairie School architecture in Kansas
Houses completed in 1923
Buildings and structures in Kansas City, Kansas
Houses in Wyandotte County, Kansas
National Register of Historic Places in Kansas City, Kansas